Dalquestia is a genus of harvestmen in the family Sclerosomatidae from North America.

Species
 Dalquestia formosa (Banks, 1910) i c g b
 Dalquestia grasshoffi 
 Dalquestia leucopyga Cokendolpher & Sissom, 2000
 Dalquestia rothorum J. C. Cokendolpher & S. A. Stockwell, 1986 b
 Dalquestia rugosa (Schenkel, 1951) i c g b
Data sources: i = ITIS, c = Catalogue of Life, g = GBIF, b = Bugguide.net

References

Harvestmen